The 1991 Mid-Eastern Athletic Conference men's basketball tournament took place February 27–March 2, 1991, at Norfolk Scope in Norfolk, Virginia. Number five seed  defeated three seed , 84–80 in the championship game, to win its first MEAC Tournament title.

The Rattlers participated in one of three play-in games to the 1991 NCAA tournament. Florida A&M was defeated by NE Louisiana and did not participate in the NCAA Tournament.

Format
All nine conference members participated, with play beginning in the first round. The top seven teams received byes to the quarterfinal round. Teams were seeded based on their regular season conference record.

Bracket

* denotes overtime period

References

MEAC men's basketball tournament
1990–91 Mid-Eastern Athletic Conference men's basketball season
MEAC men's basketball tournament
Basketball competitions in Norfolk, Virginia
College basketball tournaments in Virginia